Vladimir Kadyshevsky (5 May 1937 – 24 September 2014) was a Russian theoretical physicist.

Biography 
Kadyshevsky was born on 5 May 1937 in Moscow. He studied at the Suvorov Military School in Sverdlovsk from 1946 to 1954, before entering the physics department of the Lomonosov Moscow State University (MSU).

He graduated in 1960 and continued his studies as a postgraduate under Nikolay Bogolyubov. He successfully defended his PhD thesis in 1962, before starting work at the Laboratory of Theoretical Physics of JINR.

In 1977-78 he headed the group of Soviet physicists working at Fermilab. 

In 1983-85 he was leader of JINR’s programme for the DELPHI experiment at CERN’s LEP collider.

He was director of the JINR Laboratory of Theoretical Physics from 1987 to 1992, and director of JINR from
1992 to 2005.

External links 
 Vladimir  Georgievich   Kadyshevsky
 Vladimir Kadyshevsky Celebrates His 70th in Style
 Vladimir Georgievich Kadyshevsky 1938–2014 (obituary)
 Scientific publications of Vladimir Kadyshevsky on INSPIRE-HEP

1937 births
2014 deaths
Moscow State University alumni
Academic staff of Moscow State University
Russian physicists
Theoretical physicists
Particle physicists
Full Members of the Russian Academy of Sciences
Foreign Members of the Bulgarian Academy of Sciences
Foreign Fellows of the Indian National Science Academy
People associated with CERN
Recipients of the Order of Honour (Russia)